Freight & Container Transportation was a Sydney based monthly trade magazine covering freight transport in Australia. It was published between May 1967 and June 1985.

Overview
Freight & Container Transportation was established in May 1967 by Shennen Publishing, that already published Railway Transportation and Truck & Bus Transportation. It focussed on the road, sea and air freight industries in Australia. It ceased publication in June 1985.

References

1967 establishments in Australia
1985 disestablishments in Australia
Monthly magazines published in Australia
Transport magazines published in Australia
Defunct magazines published in Australia
Magazines established in 1967
Magazines disestablished in 1985
Magazines published in Sydney
Professional and trade magazines